Ace were a British rock band who enjoyed moderate success in the 1970s. Their membership included Paul Carrack, who later became famous as a vocalist for Mike + The Mechanics and as a solo artist. Ace are perhaps best known for their hit single "How Long", which was a top 20 single in the United Kingdom in 1974, and reached no. 3 in the United States and Canada in 1975.

Career
The band were formed in December 1972 in Sheffield as "Ace Flash and the Dynamos", but the name was soon abbreviated to "Ace". The members were assembled from various professional bands. Carrack and Terry Comer had previously played with Warm Dust, and Alan "Bam" King with Mighty Baby, whose antecedents were the 1960s band The Action. Ace were popular on the pub rock circuit. Their music was a fusion of pop and funk.

Before the recording of their debut album, Five-A-Side, the former drummer of Bees Make Honey, Fran Byrne, replaced Steve Witherington. The single "How Long" was taken from this record, and was a significant chart success, achieving a top 20 place in the UK Singles Chart, and reaching number three in the US Billboard Hot 100 chart in the spring of 1975. The Five-A-Side album did well on its own, too, peaking at number 11 on the Billboard 200. Carrack, the band's keyboardist and chief songwriter, sang lead on "How Long", but was not the band's only vocalist. Follow-up singles were sung by other band members.

Ace eventually moved to the United States, and replaced Phil Harris with Jon Woodhead in June 1976, releasing their third and final album No Strings in January 1977. Unlike earlier Ace LPs, this album featured an emphasis on Carrack's vocals, and the two singles issued from the album both featured Carrack as lead singer. The singles, however, didn't chart and the group disbanded in July 1977, when Carrack, Comer and Byrne all joined Frankie Miller's backing band.

In addition to his solo career, Carrack has since played in Eric Clapton's band, Roger Waters' The Bleeding Heart Band, Roxy Music for the Manifesto album and tour, Squeeze in the early 1980s, and Mike + The Mechanics, for which he is best known. His solo re-recording of "How Long" became a UK top 40 hit again in 1996.

Personnel
 Paul Carrack (born 22 April 1951, Sheffield, Yorkshire) – keyboards, vocals (1972–1977)
 Alan "Bam" King (born 18 September 1946, Kentish Town, London) – rhythm guitar, vocals (1972–1977)
 Terry "Tex" Comer (born 23 February 1949, Burnley, Lancashire) – bass (1972–1977)
 Phil Harris (born Philip Harris, 18 July 1948, Muswell Hill, London) – lead guitar, vocals (1972–1976)
 Steve Witherington (born 26 December 1953, Enfield, Middlesex) – drums (1972–1974)
 Fran Byrne (born 17 March 1948, Dublin, Ireland) – drums (1974–1977)
 Jon Woodhead – lead guitars, vocals (1976–1977)

Discography

Studio albums

Compilation albums
 Six-A-Side (1982)
 How Long: The Best of Ace (1987)
 The Very Best of Ace (1993)
 The Best of Ace (Varèse, 2003)

Singles

See also
List of 1970s one-hit wonders in the United States

References

External links
 Peel Sessions – 25 March 1975
 
 

English pop rock music groups
Musical groups established in 1972
Musical groups disestablished in 1977
British soft rock music groups
British pub rock music groups
Musical groups from Sheffield